Luciano Canfora (born 5 June 1942) is an Italian classicist and historian. Born in Bari, Canfora obtained his first degree in Roman History in 1964 at Pisa University. He is currently Professor Emeritus of Classics at the University of Bari. His specialty is ancient libraries and his book The Vanished Library about Library of Alexandria has been translated into some 15 languages. He has also published a history of democracy under the title La Democrazia: Storia di un'Ideologia (Bari, 2004). Since 1975, he has edited the periodical Quaderni di storia. Canfora stood in the 1999 European Parliament election for the Party of Italian Communists.

References

1942 births
Living people
People from Bari

Historians of ancient Rome